The Bee Gees Special is a 90-minute television special featuring The Bee Gees and broadcast by NBC on November 21, 1979. The program featured footage from the Bee Gees' July 10, 1979 concert at Oakland Coliseum Arena in Oakland, California captured by a film crew that accompanied them during their Spirits Having Flown Tour. It also included footage from an appearance with Willie Nelson and Glen Campbell, interviews by David Frost with the Bee Gees and their parents, and a behind-the-scenes look at recording and tour planning with Robert Stigwood and the band's crew.

Interviews/Songs
 Interview with David Frost
 In the studio rehearsing "Tragedy"
 Opening night of tour - "Stayin' Alive"
 Australian TV clip of "Spicks and Specks"
 Interview with Robert Stigwood
 Concert footage: "New York Mining Disaster 1941", "How Can You Mend a Broken Heart"
 Video montage - "How Deep Is Your Love"
 Tour planning
 1967 U.K. TV clip - "Massachusetts"
 Concert footage: "Wind Of Change"
 Creating the explosion for the song "Tragedy"
 Concert footage: "I Started a Joke"
 Jam session with Willie Nelson and Glen Campbell: "Bye Bye Love", "All I Have to Do Is Dream", "Party Doll", "I Can't Stop Loving You", "To Love Somebody"
 In the studio recording "Tragedy"
 Interview with Barbara and Hugh Gibb
 Concert footage: "Nights on Broadway", "Words", "Jive Talkin'"
 Andy Gibb joins his brothers on stage for an extended version "You Should Be Dancing"
 Closing credits over "I've Gotta Get a Message to You"

1970s American television specials
Music television specials
NBC television specials
1979 television specials